Mukkuvar is a maritime ethnic group found in the Indian states of Kerala , Tamil Nadu and the Eastern and North Western coastal regions of Sri Lanka.  They are mostly found on the Malabar Coast, South Travancore Coast and Kanyakumari district, Tamil Nadu, who have traditionally been involved in fishing and other maritime activities.

Etymology 
The caste name proposes several etymology theories. One view holds that the name Mukkuvar is derived from the Dravidian term muluku or mukku meaning "to dive", suggesting their traditional occupation in diving for pearls and seashell. Other titles used by the community are Kukankulam, Murkukan and Mukkiyar. 

The Mukkuvars are divided into exogamous clans known as llam meaning "house". The Mukkuvars of Northern Malabar are known as Nalillakkar (meaning "of the four illams") consisted of the clans known as Ponillam (from pon meaning "gold"), Chembillam (from chembu meaning "copper"), Karillam and Kachillam. The Mukkuvars of Southern Malabar have only three clans, with the absence of Ponillam, and are therefore known as Munillakar (meaning "of the three illams").

History

Early history 
The Mukkuvars historically were inhabitants of the Neithal (coastal) lands of ancient Tamilakam, and find mention in various ancient Tamil literary works.  As suggested by their name they probably involved in diving for pearls and conch. They were maritime inhabitants of the littoral Sangam landscape known as Neithal, who were involved in pearls-harvesting, boat-building, fishing, among other maritime activities. Tamil Literature Akananuru describes the ship building capabilities of Neithal inhabitants in the ancient Tamilakam in chapter [26:1-2] 

Mukkuvars had trade relation in Srilanka from 12'th century and few settled there from then. According to the legend of the Mukkuvar from Kerala, they emigrated to and from Sri Lanka. The Mattakallappu Manmiyam text and other local palm-leaf manuscripts in Srilanka attribute the emigration of the Sri Lankan Mukkuvar from South India under the rule of Kalinga Magha in 12th century AD, who delegates the power to local petty kings whose successors are identified as belonging to Kukankulam. The Mukkuvars in Kanyakumari district still have the Srilankan dialect of Tamil, which shows they emigrated to and from southern part of ancient Tamilakam and Srilanka

Medieval history 
In the 8th century made mercantile Arabs appearances in Kerala, where they among other married natives such as those from the Mukkuvar community, and formed social groups such as the Mappilas. The Mukkuvars were in addition to fishing and seafaring, involved in warfare. Native rulers such as the Zamorin of Calicut promoted Mukkuvars in coversion to Islam in order to man their navies. Up to 1000 AD were the Mukkuvars recruited to the naval fleets of the Chera dynasty. South Indian communities were often invited to Sri Lanka as mercenaries. The Sinhala text known as Dambadeni Asna refers to Mukkuvar warriors serving in the army of Parakramabahu II of Dambadeniya. As mentioned in Mattakallappu Manmiyam, they also served in the 13th century in the army of the invader Kalinga Magha, who seized control of northern and eastern parts of Sri Lanka. The Kerala-derived Mukkuvars, whose descendants are the Sri Lankan Mukkuvars, under Kalinga Magha were made chieftains known as Vanniar in the Batticaloa region, where they also formed matrilinear landlords known as Podiyar and exhibited significant political domination. Mukkuvars in alliance with Arabs encamped at the Puttalam region where in an campaign initiated by Parakramabahu VI of Kotte, battled and chased away by Karaiyar mercenaries, mentioned in Mukkara Hatana (meaning Mukkuvar war). Mukkuvar women intermarried with their allied Arabs, whose descendants reside in the  Sri Lankan Moor ethnicity.

References 

Indian castes
Social groups of Kerala